Val Valentino (born Leonard Montano, June 14, 1956) is an American magician. Valentino starred in a series of four television specials exposing the methods behind numerous classic magic tricks and illusions on the Fox network. In the specials, he used the stage name the Masked Magician and concealed his true identity by wearing a mask with a squid like design, being aware of the stigma amongst the magic community with publicly exposing tricks. As the finale to the final special, Valentino revealed his identity as the Masked Magician, garnering some notoriety amongst the magic community, and instigating several lawsuits.

Valentino became well known in Brazil after his sketches were broadcast in Rede Globo's Sunday newsmagazine show Fantástico from 1999 to 2000, in which he was referred to by the alias Mister M.

Life and career
Valentino's first foray into magic was at the age of five with a trick called "the ball and vase" that his father gave him. In his teens, Valentino performed with the "International Cultural Awareness Program" for over a million students throughout the Unified School Systems. The performances also included revealing magic secrets to encourage others to become magicians.

By the end of the 1980s and into the 1990s, Valentino had moved to Las Vegas, Nevada and was performing in casino shows including Viva Las Vegas and Splash, in addition to having appeared on programs such as The Merv Griffin Show and PM Magazine, as well as in the music video for Herb Alpert's "Magic Man". He also appeared in his own production, "Valentino's Magical Extravaganza".

In October 2017, Valentino announced that he had been diagnosed with terminal prostate cancer, and was given one year to live from the time of the diagnosis. Valentino refused conventional treatment. In June 2020 in an interview with the Brazilian show Domingo Espetacular of RecordTV, he said he was cured and that he is in Brazil preparing a project. Due to the COVID-19 pandemic, he is quarantined in the country, hosted at the Clown Rogério house.

The Masked Magician
For a span of two years (1997–1999), Valentino performed, unbilled and disguised, as the "Masked Magician" in four Fox Network specials called Breaking the Magician's Code: Magic's Biggest Secrets Finally Revealed which exposed long-guarded trade secrets. The Masked Magician was also shown in the UK on the ITV network during the late 1990s and is still occasionally repeated on ITV4. In the US, UK, Canada, and Australia, the show was made available on Netflix.

Valentino had been approached by Fox while he was performing in Las Vegas showrooms. After some negotiation, Valentino signed to do the program, promising that he would reveal the secrets behind old illusions only. At the end of the fourth and final special, Valentino revealed his true identity, although some in the magic community had already deduced it from the previous specials after recognizing certain traits of his performance. After revealing himself, Valentino emphasized that he felt that revealing the secrets would encourage children into trying magic instead of discouraging them, and that the entertainment of magic shows was more in the magician's showmanship instead of the wonder of how the trick was pulled off.

Valentino later stated on Reddit: 

Criticism was levelled at Valentino by magicians for adversely affecting their acts. Kevin Spencer, a touring magician based in Lynchburg, Virginia who performs with his wife, Cindy, says the specials forced the duo to scrap two of their tricks. Spencer stated: "We're disappointed that someone who made his living performing the art of magic for over 25 years would be so quick to betray their community." Since those illusions each cost as much as $50,000 , the Spencers brought a lawsuit against Valentino, one of several that resulted from the program. Another lawsuit was brought by magician Andre Kole, who unsuccessfully tried to prevent Fox from airing a special featuring the secret behind the Table of Death, an illusion Kole says he perfected. According to Kole, he licensed the trick to seven of the top 10 magicians in the world and estimated his financial damages as a result of the special at more than $500,000. Kole's attorney conceded the inherent difficulty in suing over the loss of a magic trick, since illusions are not among the intellectual properties covered by copyright law, but stated: "Magicians and designers of magic tricks haven't had to take those steps. A handshake has worked for several centuries."

Other magicians criticized Valentino's explanations for being sloppy or inaccurate, arguing that he gives a mistaken impression that the methods he's exposing are regularly used by professional magicians. Magician Mark Wilson, who hosted the 1960s Saturday morning children's TV series The Magic Land of Allakazam, says some of Valentino's reveals were dangerous and not generally used by fellow magicians.

New episodes of the show later returned to broadcast on MyNetworkTV. Episodes were also made available on Netflix and the Fox Reality Channel with Valentino reprising the role. Valentino also appeared in the Masked Magician persona on a 1999 episode of Diagnosis: Murder.

In October 2007, a graphic novel starring the character of the Masked Magician was released by Heavy Ink.

In 2012, the website of Nash Entertainment—the producers of the Breaking the Magician's Code: Magic's Biggest Secrets Finally Revealed—listed a movie called Masked Magician, about a magician who uses illusions to fight crime, was "in development".

References

External links

1956 births
American magicians
Living people
People from Los Angeles
American expatriates in Brazil